Mouseman Cloud is the 17th full-length solo studio album released by singer-songwriter Robert Pollard since 1996.

Track listing
"Obvious #1"
"Picnic Drums"
"Mouseman Cloud"
"Dr. Time"
"Lizard Ladder"
"Human Zoo"
"Bats Flew Up"
"Mother's Milk and Magnets"
"Continue to Break"
"I Was Silence"
"Smacks of Euphoria"
"Science Magazine"
"No Tools"
"Aspirin Moon"
"Half-Strained"
"Zen Mother Hen"
"Chief Meteorologist"

References

2012 albums
Robert Pollard albums
Fire Records (UK) albums